The 2014 FIA WTCC Race of Russia (formally the 2014 FIA WTCC Lukoil Race of Russia) was the sixth round of the 2014 World Touring Car Championship season and the second running of the FIA WTCC Race of Russia. It was held on June 8, 2014 at the Moscow Raceway in Volokolamsk, Russia.

Both races were won by Citroën Total WTCC. José María López won race one and Ma Qing Hua won race two. Ma's victory in race two was the first for a Chinese driver in a FIA World Championship race.

Background
López continued to lead the drivers' championship after the first five rounds, forty–one points ahead of his teammates and defending champion Yvan Muller. Franz Engstler held the lead of the Yokohama Trophy.

Citroën Total WTCC expanded to four cars for the Russian round with Chinese driver Ma Qing Hua joining the team. Campos Racing added a second TC2T SEAT for WTCC débutant Nikita Misiulia.

The compensation weights were changed after the previous round.

Report

Free practice
Muller was fastest in the first practice session, Gabriele Tarquini was second for the Castrol Honda World Touring Car Team and Tom Coronel was third in the ROAL Motorsport Chevrolet.

Muller stayed on top in the second practice session, Tarquini was second once again while Hugo Valente was third quickest in the Campos Racing Chevrolet.

Qualifying
Tarquini set the pace in the first part of qualifying with his teammate Tiago Monteiro second. Coronel just missed out on a place in Q2, ending the session five–hundredths of a second down on Dušan Borković. Robert Huff was the best placed of the Lada drivers in 14th while Gianni Morbidelli was 17th after running wide at turn six and damaging his front splitter. TC2 cars filled the last four positions with Franz Engstler claiming pole position and Misiulia taking the final grid slot.

López led the second part of qualifying ahead of Tarquini, Sébastien Loeb, Tom Chilton and Monteiro. Muller failed to get through to the third session after experiencing oversteer in his Citroën C-Elysée WTCC. Valente ended the session tenth to claim pole position for race two with Ma Qing Hua sharing the front row. Honda privateers Norbert Michelisz and Mehdi Bennani would start race two from the second row.

López went on to claim pole position in the Q3 shootout, Tarquini and Monteiro finished second and third ahead of Loeb and Chilton.

Race One
Tarquini charged up the inside of López at the start but the Citroën driver hung on around the outside to retain the lead. On the first lap Muller began his recovery from a bad qualifying by taking Chilton for fifth place while his teammate Loeb moved up to third at the expense of Monteiro. At the end of the second lap Borković tried a pass up the inside of Valente at the final corner and collided with the rear of his teammate, putting both drivers out of the race on the spot. The race was run under yellow flags in the final sector for the next two laps while the stricken Chevrolets were removed from the outside of the final corner. Once the yellow flags cleared Chilton retook fifth place off Muller on the pit straight after Muller ran wide at the last corner. Another driver making up after a poor qualifying was Coronel and by lap six he was hassling Michelisz for eighth place before passing him at the last corner on lap eight. In the TC2 class Misiulia passed John Filippi to move up to third in class, he held this position briefly before going off at the final corner on lap nine and putting his SEAT into the tyre barriers. In the final laps of the race there were two battles developing in the top five; Loeb was pursuing Tarquini for second while Muller was chasing Chilton's fourth place. It was on the final lap that Muller completed the pass at the first corner on Chilton by first trying to go around the outside of the Chevrolet and then switching to the inside. López had built up a lead of 3.1 seconds at the finish line and took victory with Tarquini holding off Loeb for second place.

Race Two
Campos Racing hurried to repair the car of pole sitter Valente during the fifteen minutes of repair time and got the car out three seconds before the pit lane closed. His teammate Borković did not get out in time and started the race from the pitlane. Valente started on pole and Michelisz jumped up ahead of Ma, López failed to get away and was sat on the grid as the rest of the field disappeared around the first corner. There was contact as Muller got turned around the front of Bennani as Loeb and Chilton ran wide to avoid the incident. There was contact between Mikhail Kozlovskiy and James Thompson further back while at the start of the second lap Michelisz was defending from Ma who was looking to take back second place. Race leader Valente was issued with a drive–through penalty for not having his wheel fitted at the five-minute warning before the start of the race; the battle between Michelisz and Ma would now become the battle for the lead. On lap three Loeb lost two places to Coronel and Morbidelli, up ahead Ma and Michelisz continued to battle for the lead with Ma trying a pass on Michelisz on the last corner on lap three and four. Chilton ran wide on lap five and then was tapped from behind by Morbidelli, the two incidents dropped him from fourth to outside the points in eleventh. Lap six saw Muller moving up the order and taking the Hondas of Bennani and Monteiro in one move in the opening part of the lap. Valente went into the pit lane to serve his penalty on lap seven as Ma took the lead of the race from Michelisz. Tarquini went off the circuit and after a brief delay resumed near the back of the field before returning his car to the pits to retire. At the end of lap eight Muller moved up to second with a pass on Michelisz who now had his rear bumper hanging off. On lap 12 the second factory Honda of Monteiro slowed down with technical problems which moved René Münnich up into the final points place. Ma and Muller had built up a gap of six seconds to Michelisz in third who was holding off Bennani, Coronel, Loeb and Chilton. Michelisz lost the back of his car on lap 15 and dropped behind Bennani and Coronel and into the clutches of Loeb at the start of the last lap who was himself under attack from Chilton. Despite slowing down at the finish line Ma secured his first WTCC victory ahead of Muller. Bennani took the final podium place with Coronel fourth and Loeb took fifth from Michelisz with a tap on a rear of the Zengő Motorsport Honda at the last corner.

Following a collision with Chilton during the race, Monteiro was given a five–place grid penalty for the first race in Belgium.

Results

Qualifying

Bold denotes Pole position for second race.

Race 1

Bold denotes Fastest lap.

Race 2

Bold denotes Fastest lap.

 — Borković started from the pit lane.

Standings after the event

Drivers' Championship standings

Yokohama Trophy standings

Manufacturers' Championship standings

 Note: Only the top five positions are included for both sets of drivers' standings.

References

External links
World Touring Car Championship official website

Russia
FIA WTCC Race of Russia
FIA WTCC